Owners is a 2019 Czech comedy film directed by Jiří Havelka, which he made according to his own screenplay. The story is based on the play The Society of Owners (Condominium), which Havelka also wrote and directed, and was presented by the theater company Vosto5. The performance won the Divadelní noviny award in the category of alternative theater.

Plot
Owners of flats in an apartment building meet at a regular house meeting to resolve the necessary sale of attic space to deal with the emergency state of the house. But the seemingly simple vote is complicated by the fact that everyone has their own ideas and agenda.

Cast
Tereza Voříšková as Mrs. Zahrádková
Vojtěch Kotek as Mr. Zahrádka
Dagmar Havlová as Mrs. Horváthová
Jiří Lábus as Mr. Kubát
Andrej Polák as Mr. Nitranský
Pavla Tomicová as Mrs. Procházková
Ondřej Malý as Mr. Novák
Klára Melíšková as Mrs. Roubíčková
David Novotný as Mr. Švec
Kryštof Hádek as Mr. Čermák
Stanislav Majer as Mr. Čermák
Ladislav Trojan as Mr. Sokol

Reception
Owners were nominated for 12 Czech Lion Awards including the Best film.

References

External links
 

2019 films
2019 comedy-drama films
Czech comedy-drama films
2010s Czech-language films
Czech Lion Awards winners (films)